The 2019–20 National First Division (called the GladAfrica Championship for sponsorship reasons) is the season from August 2019 to May 2020 of South Africa's second tier of professional soccer, the National First Division.

For this season, the National First Division received new sponsorship from GladAfrica, with prize money being substantially increased to R3 million for the winners, R1.5 million for the runners up and R1 million for the third-placed team.

Teams

Stadium and Locations

League table

Play-offs
Black Leopards defeated Ajax Cape Town 2-0 to retain their place in PSL.

Season statistics

Scoring

Top scorers

Hat-tricks

Notes
(H) – Home team(A) – Away team

Discipline

Player
 Most yellow cards: 11
  Paulus Masehe (Free State Stars)

 Most red cards: 2
  Daniel Gozar (Free State Stars)

See also
2019-20 South African Premier Division

References

External links
PSL.co.za

National First Division seasons
South
2019–20 in South African soccer leagues